Digital Stimulation is the debut studio album by American new wave and synth punk band Units, released in 1980, by 415 Records.

Reception 

AllMusic wrote that the album "remains a fiery, exciting document of an innovative group who redefined the potential of synthesizers in a rock band format."

Track listing

References

External links 
 

1980 albums